Moil Castle was a castle near Campbeltown, Kintyre, Scotland. It was a stronghold of Clan Donald.

Notes

References

Castles in Argyll and Bute
Clan Donald
Kintyre